The National Dance Awards 2002, were organised and presented by The Critics' Circle, and were awarded to recognise excellence in professional dance in the United Kingdom.  The ceremony was held at Sadler's Wells Theatre, London, on 14 January 2003, with awards given for productions staged in the previous year.

Awards Presented
De Valois Award for Outstanding Achievement in Dance - Christopher Bruce
Best Male Dancer - Thomas Edur
Richard Sherrington Award for Best Female Dancer - Alina Cojocaru
Best Choreography (Classical) - Christopher Hampson for Double Concerto
Best Choreography (Modern) - Mark Morris for V
Outstanding Young Female Artist (Modern) - Joanne Fong
Outstanding Young Male Artist (Modern) - Martin Lindinger
Best Foreign Dance Company - Mark Morris Dance Group from United States of America
Outstanding Young Female Artist (Classical) - Marianela Nuñez
Outstanding Young Male Artist (Classical) - Ivan Putrov
Company Prize for Outstanding Repertoire (Classical) - Birmingham Royal Ballet
Company Prize for Outstanding Repertoire (Modern) - Rambert Dance Company

Special awards
Special awards were presented to the following people for excellence in their particular field of dance that would not be recognised by existing award categories.

 Dame Beryl Grey
 Thomas Edur and Agnes Oaks

References

National Dance Awards
Dance
Dance